Waffle cookie may refer to:

Krumkake, a Norwegian waffle cookie
Pizzelle, an Italian waffle cookie
Bánh kẹp, a Vietnamese waffle cookie made from rice flour